Prophyllocnistis is a genus of moths in the family Gracillariidae.

Species
Prophyllocnistis epidrimys Davis, 1994

External links
Global Taxonomic Database of Gracillariidae (Lepidoptera)

Phyllocnistinae
Gracillarioidea genera